By the Sea is a novel by Abdulrazak Gurnah. It was first published in the United States by The New Press on 11 June 2001 and in the United Kingdom by Bloomsbury Publishing in May 2001. It is Gurnah's sixth novel. By the Sea was longlisted for the Booker Prize and shortlisted for the Los Angeles Times Book Prize.

By the Sea is narrated, in part, by a man named Saleh Omar, who is attempting to enter the United Kingdom on a fake passport. Omar also goes by the pseudonym "Rajab Shaaban Mahmud", an identity he stole to use on his fake passport. The novel is also narrated, in part, by Latif Mahmud, the son of the real Rajab Shaaban Mahmud—a man who turns out to be a scoundrel. Latif Mahmud also travels to Europe, but by a more legitimate route—obtaining a student visa to East Germany and travelling by a circuitous route from there to the UK.

Michael Pye, in a review for The New York Times, notes the novel's self-conscious echoes of Herman Melville's short story "Bartleby, the Scrivener". Saleh Omar, the protagonist, quotes Bartleby's mantra "I would prefer not to"; Pye argues that "[b]y invoking Melville, Gurnah opens a little inquest into the nature of pity itself."

Critic Sissy Helff argues that By the Sea "is a fine example of a confrontation of readers with a highly complex picture of the predicament of refugees in the wake of movement and migration".

References

Sources 
 
 

2001 novels
Bloomsbury Publishing books
The New Press books
Books by Abdulrazak Gurnah